Dr. Rudolf Wahrendorff was a German fishing trawler that was requistioned in the Second World War by the Kriegsmarine for use as a vorpostenboot, serving as V 209 Dr. Rudolf Wahrendorff. She was bombed and sunk off St. Peter Port, Guernsey, Channel Islands on 24 July 1944.

Description
The engine was made by Deschimag Seebeckwerft, Wesermünde. It was rated at 64nhp. The engine powered a single screw propeller driven via a geared low pressure turbine.

History
Dr. Rudolf Wahrendorff was built as yard number 476 by Deschimag Seebeckwerfte, Wesermünde for Grundmann & Gröschel, Wesermünde. She was launched on 17 September 1928 and completed on 17 November. The Code Letters KSBT were allocated, as was the fishing boat registration PG 383. In 1934, her Code Letters were changed to DFAV.

On 23 December 1939, Dr. Rudolf Wahrendorff was requisitioned by the Kriegsmarine for use as a vorpostenboot. She was allocated to 2 Vorpostenflotille as V 209 Dr. Rudolf Wahrendorff. On 4 July 1944 she was damaged in an attack by the motor torpedo boats HMMTB 734, HMMTB 735, HMMTB 743 and HMMTB 748 of the Royal Navy. The minesweeper  was also damaged.  V 208 R. Walther Darré and  V 210 Hinrich Hey were sunk in the battle. Dr. Rudolf Wahrendorff was bombed and sunk by Grumman Avenger aircraft of 850 Naval Air Squadron, Fleet Air Arm off Saint Peter Port, Guernsey, Channel Islands on 24 July 1944. Twenty-six crew were killed.

References

Sources

1928 ships
Ships built in Bremen (state)
Fishing vessels of Germany
Steamships of Germany
World War II merchant ships of Germany
Auxiliary ships of the Kriegsmarine
Maritime incidents in July 1944
Ships sunk by aircraft
World War II shipwrecks in the English Channel